The Sydney Women's Australian Football League (SWAFL) was the governing body of the sport of Women's Australian rules football in the state of New South Wales from 2000 to 2011. In 2012 SWAFL ceased to exist and the women's competition came under the umbrella of AFL Sydney.

Clubs - Season 2012
 Auburn Giants (Debut 2011)
 Balmain Dockers Official Site
 UNSW Eastern Suburbs Stingrays Official Site
 Macquarie University Warriors Official Site
 Newtown Breakaways Official Site
 Penrith Ramettes (Debut 2012)Official Site
 Southern Power Official Site (Debut 2010)
 Sydney University Official Site
 Western Wolves Women's Football Club Official Site
 Wollongong Saints Official Site (Debut 2010)
 UTS Shamrocks (Debut 2009 as Bondi Shamrocks) Official Website

Previous Clubs that have participated in the SWAFL Competition have included

 Bondi Shamrocks Official Website, 2009-2011
 Camden Power, 2004-2006
 St George Crows, 2007-2008 (then St George Dragons in 2009)
 Sydney Uni Blue team, 2004-2007
 University of Technology, Sydney (UTS), 2001-2005

2012 Ladder 
																		
																		
FINALS

See also

List of Australian rules football women's leagues

External links

Women's Australian rules football leagues in Australia
Australian rules football competitions in New South Wales
Sports leagues established in 1994
1994 establishments in Australia
Organisations based in Sydney
2012 disestablishments in Australia